Kirkland Hogue "Kirk" Donald (born September 15, 1953) is a retired Admiral in the United States Navy, who in his last assignment served as the dual-hatted position of Director of Naval Nuclear Propulsion and Deputy Administrator of the National Nuclear Security Administration. Donald previously served as Commander, Submarine Force, U.S. Atlantic Fleet, and Commander, Submarine Allied Command, Atlantic. He retired from active duty on November 2, 2012.

Education
Originally from Norlina, North Carolina, Donald graduated from the United States Naval Academy in 1975 with a Bachelor of Science in ocean engineering. He also holds an MBA from the University of Phoenix and is a graduate of Harvard University’s John F. Kennedy School of Government Senior Executive Fellows Program.

Navy career

He served as Commander, Submarine Development Squadron Twelve from August 1995 to July 1997. From June 2002 to July 2003, he was assigned as Commander, Submarine Group Eight; Commander, Submarine Force Sixth Fleet (CTF 69); Commander, Submarines Allied Naval Forces South; and Commander, Fleet Ballistic Missile Submarine Force (CTF 164) in Naples, Italy. Most recently, he served as Commander, Naval Submarine Forces; Commander, Submarine Force, U.S. Atlantic Fleet; Commander, Allied Submarine Command, Atlantic; and Commander, Task Forces 84 and 144 in Norfolk, Virginia.

His shore assignments include the Pacific Fleet Nuclear Propulsion Examining Board and on the staff of the Director of Naval Nuclear Propulsion. He also served at the Bureau of Naval Personnel (BUPERS), on the Joint Staff, and as Deputy Chief of Staff for C4I, Resources, Requirements and Assessments for the U.S. Pacific Fleet.

Admiral Donald began his tenure as Director of the Naval Nuclear Propulsion Program, on 5 November 2004—a unique eight-year posting which was originally created and served in by Admiral Hyman G. Rickover. The appointment as Director is both a military and civilian position as it is the head of both the Naval Nuclear Propulsion Program in the Department of the Navy and the National Nuclear Security Administration in the Department of Energy. See Naval Reactors for more information.

As reported on March 25, 2008, Donald was assigned by Secretary of Defense Robert Gates to investigate the 2007 United States Air Force nuclear weapons incident where nuclear missile fuses were mistakenly sent to the island of Taiwan. Gates, when accepting the resignations of both Secretary of the Air Force Michael W. Wynne and Chief of Staff of the Air Force General T. Michael Moseley on June 5, 2008, cited the report's findings of a "decline in the Air Force's nuclear mission focus and performance" and a "lack of a critical self-assessment culture" in the Air Force. However, specific details of Admiral Donald's report remain classified.

Admiral Donald was relieved as Director, Naval Nuclear Propulsion by Admiral John M. Richardson, on 3 November 2012.

Awards and decorations
Donald's awards include:

Footnotes

References
Official Biography (This work is in the public domain.)
VFW seeks financial assistance for Donald monument
Henderson Daily Dispatch: Admiral Kirkland Donald honored with monument by Veterans of Foreign Wars
Pentagon Admits Mistake in Arms Shipment

External links

United States Navy admirals
Recipients of the Navy Distinguished Service Medal
Recipients of the Legion of Merit
United States Naval Academy alumni
University of Phoenix alumni
Harvard Kennedy School alumni
People from Warren County, North Carolina
Living people
1953 births
Recipients of the Defense Superior Service Medal